Agave sileri (synonym Manfreda sileri) is a species of Agave known only from coastal areas in the States of Texas and Tamaulipas. It grows on open locations with clay soil, at elevations below 100 m (330 feet). Siler's tuberose is a common name.

Agave sileri is a perennial herb spreading by means of globose underground rhizomes. It produces rosettes of waxy, light green leaves mottled with dark green or brown spots. The flowering stalk can reach a height of up to 220 cm (7.2 feet), with as many as 80 greenish-yellow flowers bearing large yellow anthers.

References

sileri
Flora of Texas
Flora of Tamaulipas